Monkee Flips is a compilation album of songs by the Monkees, issued by Rhino Records in 1984. Labeled as the "Best of the Monkees, Volume Four" (as it followed the two Arista Records compilations Greatest Hits and More Greatest Hits and the Rhino Records picture disc Monkee Business), the album featured an all-stereo selection of single sides and album tracks, including several songs featured in the Monkees TV series. It was available on both LP record and cassette formats. 

"Tear Drop City", "Good Clean Fun" and "Oh My My", all of which charted in the Billboard Top 100, make their American "greatest hits" debut with this package (the latter two had previously appeared on the 1979 Australian compilation Monkeemania (40 Timeless Hits)). Seven of the 14 tracks — "You Told Me", "I Love You Better", "Forget That Girl", "No Time", "Dream World", "Little Girl" and "Daily Nightly" — all make their first appearance on any Monkees "greatest hits" package here. The album is also notable for containing a previously unreleased alternate mix of "Circle Sky" with a different lead vocal from Michael Nesmith.

The LP was reissued in 1986 with a different mix of "Forget That Girl" featuring some opening studio chatter and a mono mix of "Love Is Only Sleeping". The sleeve and label are the same for both releases, with only an "RE-1" in the run-off groove of the vinyl denoting the update. 

The album cover shows a still photograph of the Monkees (with Peter Tork playing banjo) from a filmed performance of "What Am I Doing Hangin' 'Round", featured in the second season episode of The Monkees entitled "A Nice Place to Visit". 

The liner notes included a detailed recap of the Monkees' career, with then-recent interview comments from Nesmith and Dolenz.

Monkee Flips went out of print as Rhino shifted from vinyl releases to compact discs. Each of the tracks have since been reissued, digitally remastered, on various individual Monkees CDs.

Track listing
Side 1

Side 2

References

The Monkees compilation albums
1984 compilation albums
Rhino Records compilation albums